The Boss (대국남아, often referred to as DGNA or, incorrectly, D-NA) was a South Korean boy band with five members, formed under Open World Entertainment in 2010. In South Korea they are known as Dae Guk Nam Ah, literally meaning  "The Boys of Super Space", which is how their English name of 'The Boss' was formed.  In Japan, they are known as Daikoku Danji (大国男児).

The group now consists of Karam, Injun, and Jay. Mika left the group in December of 2018 after posting a message of departure on his now deleted Instagram, and Hyunmin left after 7 years according to his speech on I Can See Your Voice Season 9 Episode 6. All five members of The Boss were formerly members of Xing Entertainment and members of the generation band Xing with different stage names. After being officially announced on January 28, 2010, The Boss debuted on March 4, 2010, with their song "Admiring Boy" on Mnet M!Countdown. On June 18, 2010, they performed a comeback on KBS2's Music Bank with "Biteul, Biteul (비틀비틀)", also known as "Stumble Stumble" after releasing the respective music video. They also went on to promote another song, "Nobody...Anybody (아무도...그누구도)" in August 2010, but without a music video release.

Since September 2010, The Boss spent a year promoting their Japanese singles, "Love Power", "Love Bingo", and "Love Parade" in April 2011, June 2011 and September 2011 respectively as part of their "Love Series" before returning to Korea to promote "Lady" in late October 2011. They have been commonly known as 'K-Pop re-exported from Japan' as they have used a ‘Japan-First, Korea-Later’ strategy in their performances.

History

Pre-debut and Xing 
The original Xing was formed in 2006 with none of the members of The Boss. Hyunmin replaced one of the original Xing members, Choi Sungsoo. In early 2008, the three remaining members of Xing were joined by the other three members of Xing Entertainment's other band, Singing In The Rain (including The Boss member Mika) as well as a new special dance member, Jeon Jihwan (The Boss member Jay). After the only original remaining Xing member, Kevin, left the band, he was replaced by two new members, Park Hyunchul and Lee Injoon (both now The Boss members). All of the members of 4th generation Xing were replaced to create a 5th generation, and from there, The Boss members went to sign under Open World Entertainment to create a new boyband.

Originally, The Boss was meant to consist of seven members, including the other two members of 4th generation Xing (Kim Jisang and Shin Gwangchul), however, both chose not to go with the band for personal reasons.

2010: Debut and mini-album, Awake
On March 4, 2010, The Boss made their debut performance on M! Countdown with their first song "Admiring Boy" (Korean: 동경소년).

Their first dance/ballad mini-album Awake was released on the 17th of June 2010 and included the singles "Admiring Boy" and 눈부신 세계 (Shining World), as well as the more recent release of their next promotion, 'Stumble Stumble' ('비틀비틀').

The Boss appears in a live Japanese variety show called Made in BS Japan as Monday special MCs. Made in BS Japan is a television show that introduces various food, fashion, and history from all over Asia. The Boss started appearing on October 4, 2010. Starting January 2011, The Boss is now in charge of the Wednesday show which talks about the Korean entertainment because U-KISS who is in charge as Wednesday special MCs have graduated from the show due to busy schedules.

2011: Japan and Korea

Popsicle and Rookie Award
In January 2011, they returned to the music scene with a 3-member unit group named Popsicle with members Mika, Karam, and Jay. On 12 January,they release their music video,titled “I’ll Love You Until It Snows in the Middle of a Summer Day” and made debut performances on Music Bank on 14 January 2011 and ended their promotion on 22 January 2011 along with the other two members, Hyunmin and Injun. On 20 January 2011, The BOSS won the Newcomer Award at 20th Seoul Music Awards.
On 23 January 2011 they went back to Japan to get ready for their Japanese debut.  Their official fancolor of pearl terracotta was revealed during February 2011 on their official website.

First Japanese single-Love Power
On March 30, 2011, The Boss released their first Japanese singles' PV: "Love Power." Their first Japanese single was released on April 13, 2011. They made their debut along with their live event from April 12, 2011, until  April 17, 2011, which took place at Fukuoka, Hyogo, Sapporo, Nagoya and Tokyo. This debut makes them popular in Japan placing 6th place on Oricon Daily Chart and 9th places on Oricon Weekly Charts. The single made it to the Oricon Monthly Charts, ranked 30th spot with 12,136 copies sold. This was their first large effort to make into Japanese music market.

Prior to their debut in Japan, they took 6 months to study Japanese language started from September 2010. They mastered Japanese in a short time and improved their Japanese from time to time. Now they can converse in Japanese very well. Uniquely, they made new songs for Japanese  debut instead of using their translated Korean songs as their Japanese songs like other groups did. It is original, new and fresh Japanese songs made specially for their Japanese debut.

Love Bingo
On June 15, 2011, The Boss released their second Japanese single, titled "Love Bingo!. "The 'Premium Live & Bingo Event' in Shibuya-AX Tokyo was performed on 21 May 2011. The members gave their valuable things to the five lucky fans. Love Bingo ranked at #12 on CD TV’s Domestic Charts 2011. The ‘Love Bingo!’ Live & Love Exchange Event took place from 15 June 2011 until 19 June 2011 at Fukuoka, Sapporo, Hyogo, Tokyo and Nagoya.

Love Parade
On September 21, 2011, The Boss released their third Japanese single, titled "Love Parade", originally intended as the last of their "Love Series." The single peaks at number 8 on its first week on Oricon Weekly Charts and also the one of their best singles with over 18,000 copies sold on their first week. Love Parade also made it to the Oricon Monthly Charts, ranked 26th spot. The Boss also managed to gather 30,000 fans for their Love Parade event held in Sapporo, Fukuoka, Nagoya, Osaka, and Kanagawa.

2nd Korean single-Lady
In September 2011, after almost one year in Japan, The Boss came back to Korea to promote their new second single album, Lady. The single contains two songs, Lady and Calling You as well as one instrumental song.It's for the first time to use a ballad song as their title song. They showed a perfect performance with a fantastic harmony during their comeback on SBS Inkigayo on 30 October 2011, and were exalted with compliments. Additionally, the “tiger like” voice of the member Hyunmin was a commented subject and received a lot of interest. On 30 October 2011, they release Lady Live version video on YouTube. It overtook Girls' Generation's "The Boys" for the 2nd spot of Korean sales in Japan at that time. They wrapped up their Lady promotions on 19 November 2011 at Live Power Music.  They spent only one month in Korea, and went back to Japan on 21 November 2011.

Love Days
On December 7, 2011, The Boss released a new single in their Japanese "Love Series" titled "Love Days". It is their fourth Japanese single since Love Power and continuing their 'Love Series' trend.The single went on to reach seventh spot on Oricon Weekly Charts on its first week with 17,758 copies sold. They also managed to attracts 10,000 fans on their live event which held on 10 December 2011. Love Days also manages to reach 4th spot on USEN’s K-Pop's Weekly Chart on December 28, 2011.

Love Parade, Love Days, Love Bingo!, Love Power were ranked 32nd, 33rd, 38th and 42nd respectively in K-Pop Groups’ Japanese Singles Sales Ranking Chart 2011.

2012: 1st Japanese and Cancelled Korean album
On January 18, 2012, The Boss released their first Japanese album, Love Letters. It sold 14,379 copies and was placed at #7 on Oricon Weekly Charts. This was followed by the release of their fifth Japanese single, Jumping on March 28, 2012.

Since the arrest of Open World Entertainment CEO Jang Seok-woo for sexual harassment on 10 April 2012 and his subsequent detention in police custody on 13 April, the group has cancelled the planned released of their first Korean album, Shadow. Together with label mate X-5 have stopped their activities and performances.

2013: 2nd Japanese Album, POOM Entertainment and Korean album
On the 13th of March, 2013 the group had released their 2nd Full Japanese Album, 'On the Way'. The album had 7,624 sold and was placed 8th on the Oricon Daily Album Charts and 16th on Oricon Weekly Album Charts. The album featured 12 songs with "Yume Made Ato..." (夢まであと・・・) as their title song.

Breaking the 2-year hiatus in Korea, POOM Entertainment released a statement that The Boss had signed a contract with them and would be releasing an album in November. Their first teaser was released on 26 November 2013, followed by their second on 27 November 2013. Their music video was later on released on 28 November 2013 as well as their digital album. The physical album later was released on 2 December 2013

2014: 3rd Single Album
On the 14th of October, The Boss released their music video alongside their physical album titled "Rilla Go!"

2015: Digital Single "Who?" and back to XING Entertainment
On February 25, DGNA released a digital single, "Who?", the single wasn't promoted and a physical release was only sold on japanese events. After the release the group went out a few months without activities, it was only with the announcement of a fan-meeting in Japan that the fans were informed that DGNA left POOM Entertainment - as the company went bankrupt - and joined XING Entertainment again. At the same time, Karam got a role on the kids' tv show Tooniverse Character Island 3.

2016-present: 8th Japanese Single "Oh My Girl!" and Japanese Activities
Since signing with XING, DGNA went on constant Japanese activities, holding concerts and fan meetings almost every month.

On March 30 they released their eighth Japanese single, Oh My Girl!, with Universal Japan. The single placed 12th on the Oricon Daily Charts. The single also included a Japanese version of "Who?". The group promoted the single and shortly after announced a small tour in Japan in May. The tour was called "Are You Ready?" with dates in Tokyo, Shizuoka, Miyagi and Osaka. In September, the group held a few concerts calling it "Autumn Carnival!".

Hyunmin left the group, it's not known when, and has for the last 2 years been pursuing a career as an artist.

Members
Current
 Karam (Park Hyunchul)
 Injun (Lee Injoon)
 Jay (Jeon Jihwan)

Former
 Mika (Lee Suhoon)
 Hyunmin (Woo Hyunmin)

Filmography

Discography

 Love Letters (2012)
 On The Way (2013)

Awards

Concerts and Events
대국남아 First Mini Concert [Haengdang-dong, Seoul] (September 11, 2010)
Open-World Festival [Odaiba Dipa Ariake Concert Hall, Tokyo] (November 26, 2011)
「大国男児 Japan First Live 2012」[Shibuya Public Hall, Tokyo] (March 20, 2012)
「大国男児 Summer Magic Live 2012」[Zepp Tokyo, Tokyo] (September 7, 2012) and [Zepp Namba, Osaka] (September 9, 2012)
「大国男児 Special Live “BLACK&WHITE”」[Zepp Tokyo, Tokyo] (March 20, 2013)

Trivia
Fan Club: The Fan Club of The Boss is named as "Master" which was revealed on 28 February 2012.
The meaning behind "Master" is The Boss’ owners who have mastered everything about them.
It means the artiste and fans trust each other and stand by each other.

References

External links
 DGNA's Official Japanese Site 
 Open World Entertainment Official Youtube Channel

K-pop music groups
South Korean boy bands
South Korean dance music groups

Japanese-language singers
Musical groups established in 2010
Daikoku Danji
2010 establishments in South Korea
Peak Time contestants